Petr Kafka (born October 2, 1989) is a Czech professional ice hockey player. He is currently a free agent having last played for HC Košice of the Slovak Extraliga.

Kafka previously played HC Sparta Praha, HC Kladno, HC '05 Banská Bystrica, HC Olomouc and HC Vítkovice

References

External links
 
 

1989 births
HC '05 Banská Bystrica players
HC Berounští Medvědi players
Czech ice hockey forwards
Rytíři Kladno players
HC Košice players
Living people
BK Mladá Boleslav players
HC Olomouc players
IHC Písek players
HC Sparta Praha players
Ice hockey people from Prague
HC Vítkovice players
Competitors at the 2013 World Games
Competitors at the 2022 World Games
World Games silver medalists
World Games bronze medalists
20th-century Czech people
21st-century Czech people
Czech expatriate ice hockey players in Slovakia
LHK Jestřábi Prostějov players
HC Frýdek-Místek players
HC Slavia Praha players